First Unitarian Church may refer to:

First Unitarian Church (Berkeley, California), listed on the National Register of Historic Places (NRHP)
First Unitarian Church of Los Angeles, Los Angeles, California
First Unitarian Church of Oakland, Oakland, California, NRHP-listed
First Unitarian Church of San Jose, San Jose, California, NRHP-listed
First Unitarian Church of Honolulu, Honolulu, Hawaii
First Unitarian Church of Chicago, Chicago, Illinois
First Unitarian Church of Hobart, Hobart, Indiana, NRHP-listed
First Unitarian Church (Des Moines, Iowa), one of the notable Unitarian churches
First Unitarian Church (Iowa City, Iowa), NRHP-listed
First Unitarian Church (Baltimore, Maryland), NRHP-listed
First Unitarian Church (Peabody, Massachusetts), NRHP-listed
First Unitarian Church (Somerville, Massachusetts), NRHP-listed
First Unitarian Church (Stoneham, Massachusetts), NRHP-listed
First Unitarian Church of Detroit, Detroit, Michigan, NRHP-listed
First Unitarian Church of Omaha, Omaha, Nebraska, NRHP-listed
First Unitarian Church of Philadelphia, Philadelphia, Pennsylvania, NRHP-listed
First Unitarian Church of Providence, Rhode Island
First Unitarian Church of Rochester, Rochester, New York
First Unitarian Church (Cincinnati, Ohio), NRHP-listed
First Unitarian Church of Marietta, Marietta, Ohio, NRHP-listed
First Unitarian Church of Portland, Portland, Oregon, NRHP-listed
First Unitarian Church (Milwaukee, Wisconsin), NRHP-listed

See also
First Unitarian Society (disambiguation)
List of Unitarian churches